Betibú is a 2014 Argentine crime mystery film directed by Miguel Cohan and based on the novel by Claudia Piñeiro.

Cast 
 Mercedes Morán - Nurit Iscar
 Daniel Fanego - Jaime Brena
 Alberto Ammann - Mariano Saravia
 José Coronado - Lorenzo Rinaldi
 Osmar Núñez - Roberto Gandolfini
 Norman Briski - Gato
 Lito Cruz - Venturini

References

External links 

2010s crime thriller films
2014 crime thriller films
Argentine crime thriller films
Argentine mystery films
Films about journalism
Films based on Argentine novels
Films set in Argentina
Films based on crime novels
2010s Argentine films